Banihal Qazigund Road Tunnel is a road tunnel in Jammu and Kashmir, India. It is located in the Lower Himalayas, on National Highway 44. Its Construction started in 2011 and was completed in 2021.

It is one of the longest tunnel in India, with a length of   The tunnel reduces the distance between Srinagar and Jammu by 16 km. It also reduces the travel time between these cities from 6 hours to 5.5 hours.

The tunnel consists of two parallel tunnels, one for each direction of travel. The two tunnels are interconnected by a passage every  for maintenance and emergency evacuation. The tunnel has forced ventilation to extract smoke and stale air and infuse fresh air. It has state-of-the-art monitoring and control systems for security. Built at a cost of ₹2,100 crore, it is expected that vehicles will have to pay a toll to use the tunnel.

Construction

Construction of this tunnel started in 2011 along with the project to widen NH 44 (which was known as NH 1A before all the national highways were renumbered in the year 2010) to four lanes. The new tunnel's average elevation at 1,790 m is 400 m lower than the existing Jawahar tunnel's elevation, making it less prone to avalanches. The tunnel has reduced the road distance between Banihal and Qazigund by 16 km (10 mile).

 As of May 2016, 7.2 km of the 8.5 km had been excavated.
 As of February 2017, the tunnel excavation was close to completion.
 February 2018: Boring work of one tunnel had been completed.
 May 2018: Boring of the entire 8.5 km tunnel was completed on 20 May 2018.
 Jan 2019:Tunnel may open for traffic by March 2020.
 November 2019: Work progressing at slow pace; tunnel to be opened for traffic in March 2021.
25 February 2021:Tunnel likely to open for traffic in April 2021
 5 April 2021: opening delayed until end of April 2021.
 Jun 2021: Tunnel is almost ready, could be made operations in few weeks. 
July 2021: Tunnel could be inaugurated on the independence day by Prime Minister Narendra Modi.
August 2021: Tunnel was opened by Road Transport and Highways Minister Nitin Gadkari.

Location

Safety measures

The tunnel is made on Build–operate–transfer basis. It is built with an exhaust system to remove gas and bring in fresh air. It has 126 jet fans, 234 CCTV cameras and a firefighting system installed.

Gallery

See also
 Jawahar Tunnel
 Dr. Syama Prasad Mookerjee Tunnel
 Chattergala Tunnel
 Zoji-la Tunnel
 Z-Morh Tunnel
 Pir Panjal Railway Tunnel
 NH 44 (former name NH 1A before renumbering of all national highways)

References

Road tunnels in Jammu and Kashmir
Road infrastructure in India
Road tunnels in India
Ramban district
Anantnag district